Nunzio Campanile is an American football coach. He is currently the Tight Ends Coach at Syracuse University. Campanile was previously the interim head coach at Rutgers, he was elevated to that position from that of tight ends coach after the firing of head coach Chris Ash and offensive coordinator John McNulty.

Coaching career

High school
Campanile spent the eight years as the head coach at Bergen Catholic, including winning a state title in 2017 against Saint Peters Prep in a 44-7 win, after working as offensive coordinator at Don Bosco Prep from 2000-2009.

Rutgers
In 2018 Nunzio joined the Rutgers staff after leaving high school football, and is the team's tight ends coach. The following year he began the season as the team's tight ends coach, however he also served as the interim head coach and offensive coordinator for the final eight games of the 2019 season. In 2020 with the hiring of Greg Schiano, Nunzio was the only holdover from the previous staff and returned to be the team's tight ends coach. On October 9, 2022, following the dismissal of Sean Gleeson, Scarlet Knights' offensive coordinator, Nunzio was named interim Offensive Coordinator and Quarterbacks Coach.

Syracuse
In January 2023, he was hired as Tight Ends coach at Syracuse University.

Head coaching record

College

Personal life
Campanile grew up in New Jersey in an Italian-American family full of football coaches. Growing up he watched his father, Mike, coach at Paramus Catholic High School in New Jersey for 10 years. Mike and his brother Vito coach at Bergen Catholic High School. Anthony is a part of the Miami Dolphins coaching staff while his other brother Nicky, is a coach at DePaul High School.

References

External links
 Syracuse profile
 Rutgers profile

Year of birth missing (living people)
Living people
Rutgers Scarlet Knights football coaches
High school football coaches in New Jersey
Amherst College alumni
Montclair State University alumni
People from Fair Lawn, New Jersey
Sportspeople from Bergen County, New Jersey
Coaches of American football from New Jersey
Paramus Catholic High School alumni